George Chisholm may refer to:

 George Chisholm (geographer) (1850–1930), British geographer
 George Chisholm (musician) (1915–1997), British trombone player and bandleader
 George Chisholm (athlete) (1887–?), American track and field athlete
 George King Chisholm (1814–1874), first mayor of Oakville, Ontario, Canada
 George Chisholm MacKay (1898–1973), Canadian First World War flying ace
 Brock Chisholm (George Brock Chisholm, 1896–1971), Canadian medical practitioner